David John Beasant (born 20 March 1959) is an English football coach and former football goalkeeper.

As a player, he was a goalkeeper, who notably played top-flight football for Wimbledon, Newcastle United, Chelsea, Southampton and Nottingham Forest. He also was on the books at Premier League teams Tottenham Hotspur, Wigan Athletic and Fulham but failed to make an appearance for either. He spent the rest of his career in the Football League with Grimsby Town, Wolverhampton Wanderers, Portsmouth, Bradford City and Brighton & Hove Albion as well as with Non-league sides Edgware Town and North Greenford United He played in Wimbledon's 1988 FA Cup victory, during which he became the first goalkeeper to save a penalty in an FA Cup final and the first goalkeeper since 1875 to lift the cup as captain of the winning team. He made two appearances for the England national football team. On 10 May 2015, Beasant became the oldest individual to be selected in the squad for a match in Football League history while representing Stevenage as a substitute against Southend United in the League Two Play-Off semi-final second leg, at the age of 56.

Since retiring, Beasant has worked as a goalkeeping coach for Fulham, Northern Ireland, the Glenn Hoddle Academy, Bristol Rovers, Stevenage and Reading.

Football career

Wimbledon
Beasant entered the Football League in 1979 at the age of 20 when Wimbledon, newly promoted to the Third Division, signed him from his local non-league club Edgware Town. He made his debut for Wimbledon against Blackpool on 12 January 1980 and played once again that season, in which Wimbledon were relegated. He became a regular first team player the following campaign, when they were promoted, and he stayed loyal to the club even when they were relegated again in 1982. He was a key player in the side that then won the Fourth Division title in 1983, won promotion from the Third Division a year later, and completed a four-season rise to the First Division in 1986 in only their ninth season as a Football League team. After their promotion in 1986, Wimbledon rose to the top of the First Division in early September before finishing sixth at the end of the 1986–87 season.

He became the first goalkeeper to save a penalty in an FA Cup final when he blocked John Aldridge's spot-kick for Liverpool in 1988, and in doing so helped Wimbledon secure a 1–0 win. He was also the first goalkeeper to captain his team in an FA Cup final since Major William Merriman in 1875. His ability to kick the ball some considerable distance fitted in well with the "long ball" style of play Wimbledon were known for in the 1980s, nor was he afraid to move out of the area and upfield before kicking the ball, or to take free kicks.

Newcastle United
However, the 1988 FA Cup final was the last game that Beasant played for Wimbledon. A month later he was sold to Newcastle United for £850,000.

Chelsea
Beasant's spell on Tyneside was brief as the Magpies struggled and were finally relegated from the First Division in bottom place. Beasant had left in January 1989 to join Chelsea. He immediately became first choice keeper, replacing Roger Freestone. Between 1981 and 1990 (across most of his time with Wimbledon, the season at Newcastle and the start of his Chelsea spell) he made 394 consecutive league appearances, the second-highest sequence in English football history.

In September 1992, two mistakes in a match against Norwich City led to Chelsea manager Ian Porterfield telling the media that Beasant would never play for the club again, although in fact he returned to the side when Porterfield was sacked later that season.

During the 1993–94 season Beasant sustained an unusual injury when, while making a sandwich in his kitchen, he dropped a 2 kg glass bottle of salad cream on his foot, severing the tendon to his big toe. As a result, he missed eight weeks of the season.

Following the arrival of new manager, Glenn Hoddle, who opted for Dmitri Kharine as his first choice keeper with Kevin Hitchcock in reserve, Beasant was unable to get back into the Chelsea squad and looked for a new club.

Southampton
Beasant signed for Southampton in November 1993 for a fee of £300,000 to replace the recently departed Tim Flowers. Beasant made his debut in a 1–0 defeat at Everton on 4 December; despite a run of four defeats, his confidence gradually returned, and he soon became a favourite with The Dell crowd. With the departure of Ian Branfoot and his replacement as manager by Alan Ball, the "Saints" eventually climbed out of the relegation zone, finishing the 1993–94 season one point above relegated Sheffield United.

At the start of the 1994–95 season, he was replaced by Bruce Grobbelaar but was restored as first-choice keeper for the last month of the season. Following Alan Ball's move to Manchester City in the summer of 1995, new manager Dave Merrington preferred Beasant in goal. The team struggled throughout the season, and were never far from the relegation zone, but finished level on points but with a better goal difference than Ball's Manchester City who were relegated. Beasant himself finished the season by being voted the club's Player of the Season.

For the 1996–97 season, Graeme Souness was appointed manager; initially, Souness kept faith with Beasant but after a series of injuries (during which Saints took Chris Woods on loan), Souness signed Maik Taylor from Barnet in January. Beasant's final first-team game for Southampton was a 1–0 defeat against Liverpool on 29 December 1996. Following the arrival of Paul Jones in the summer of 1997, Beasant was now only third-choice 'keeper, and after a loan move to Nottingham Forest in August 1997, the transfer was made permanent in November. In his four years at The Dell, he made a total of 105 appearances in all competitions.

Later career
In November 1997, he signed for Nottingham Forest at 38 years old, after a short period on loan. He spent four years at the City Ground, during which time they were relegated from the Premier League one season after promotion. He went on to become Forest's oldest ever player at 42. He then signed for Portsmouth in August 2001 after their regular goalkeeper Aaron Flahavan was killed in a car crash.

In November 2001 Beasant terminated his contract at Portsmouth and signed for Tottenham Hotspur on a two-month contract.

He played his last competitive game in the 2002–03 season for Brighton & Hove Albion in Division One at the age of 43, although he did spend the 2003–04 season registered as a player with Fulham in the FA Premier League. By then he was the oldest player registered with any professional club in England. He came out of retirement on  17 August 2013 to play for Southern League Division One Central club North Greenford United in a 2–0 defeat against Chalfont St Peter.

Having joined Stevenage as the club's goalkeeping coach in the middle of 2014, Beasant was named as a substitute for an away match at Carlisle United on 11 October 2014, aged 55.

International career
Beasant was selected to play two full international matches for England by manager Bobby Robson. The first of Beasant's two England caps came at Wembley Stadium on 15 November 1989 against Italy in a friendly match, where he replaced Peter Shilton as a half-time substitute and kept a clean sheet in a 0–0 draw. The following month on 13 December, also at Wembley,  he made his second appearance in a friendly against Yugoslavia, again as a half-time substitute in a 2–1 win for England. He was a member of England's 1990 FIFA World Cup squad, having been called up after David Seaman had to withdraw through injury.

Coaching career
By the time of his retirement, Beasant had been appointed as a goalkeeping coach at Fulham in addition to serving as goalkeeping coach for Northern Ireland under former Wimbledon teammate Lawrie Sanchez. Beasant resigned from the Northern Ireland post in 2007 after Sanchez was appointed Fulham manager only for the pair to both be sacked by the club in December 2007.

Beasant was a senior coach at the Glenn Hoddle Academy. He joined in 2008 and worked not only with the Academy's goalkeepers, but also outfield players, especially defenders. In August 2012, Beasant was appointed part-time goalkeeper coach at Bristol Rovers. In July 2014, he became goalkeeping coach at Stevenage where he joined his son Sam Beasant. On 25 June 2015, he was appointed as goalkeeping coach at Reading. On 22 December 2018, Beasant was released after the club appointed Jose Gomes to replace Paul Clement as manager.

Career statistics

Honours

Wimbledon
 FA Cup winner: 1988
 Football League Third Division runner-up: 1983–84
 Football League Fourth Division champion: 1982–83
 Football League Group Cup runner-up: 1982

Chelsea
Full Members Cup winner: 1990

Nottingham Forest
 Football League First Division champion: 1997–98

References

External links

1959 births
Living people
Footballers from Willesden
English footballers
English Football League players
Association football goalkeepers
Wimbledon F.C. players
Newcastle United F.C. players
Chelsea F.C. players
Grimsby Town F.C. players
Wolverhampton Wanderers F.C. players
Southampton F.C. players
Nottingham Forest F.C. players
Portsmouth F.C. players
Tottenham Hotspur F.C. players
Bradford City A.F.C. players
Wigan Athletic F.C. players
Brighton & Hove Albion F.C. players
Fulham F.C. players
North Greenford United F.C. players
Fulham F.C. non-playing staff
Premier League players
England international footballers
England B international footballers
1990 FIFA World Cup players
Edgware Town F.C. players
Stevenage F.C. players
Bristol Rovers F.C. non-playing staff
Reading F.C. non-playing staff
English football managers
FA Cup Final players
Association football goalkeeping coaches